This page lists public opinion polls conducted for the 2007 French presidential election, which was held on 22 April 2007 with a run-off on 6 May 2007.

Unless otherwise noted, all polls listed below are compliant with the regulations of the national polling commission (Commission nationale des sondages) and utilize the quota method.

First round 
During the 2007 presidential election, Ipsos launched the first ever rolling poll in France, described as a "continuous electoral barometer", publishing results every day of the week except Sunday for ten weeks starting on 1 March 2007. The Ifop poll conducted from 23 to 26 February 2007, marked with an asterisk (*) below, was conducted specifically for subsample data.

The publication of first-round polls was prohibited after midnight on 20 April 2007. The TNS Sofres poll conducted from 20 to 21 April was an internal survey which was not distributed during the electoral silence.

Graphical summary 
The averages in the graphs below were constructed using polls listed below conducted by the six major French pollsters. The graphs are smoothed 14-day weighted moving averages, using only the most recent poll conducted by any given pollster within that range (each poll weighted based on recency).

On 6 November 2006, Jean-Pierre Chevènement announced his candidacy in the presidential election, before withdrawing just a month later on 10 December 2006 after concluding an agreement with the Socialist Party (PS) for an alliance in the subsequent legislative elections. On 7 November, Nicolas Hulot launched an appeal to candidates to commit to an "Ecological Pact", but affirmed that he would on 22 January 2007 that he would not stand as a candidate in the election. In an interview published on 28 December 2006, Michèle Alliot-Marie evoked the possibility of a candidacy without the support of her party, having recently founded the think tank "Le Chêne"; however, she ultimately announced her support for Nicolas Sarkozy on 12 January 2007. In an interview published on 11 March, Corinne Lepage announced that she would back François Bayrou despite having "the capacity" to obtain the 500 sponsorships necessary to be a candidate. In an interview published on 17 March, Nicolas Dupont-Aignan announced that he had failed to gather enough sponsorships to stand in the election. Jacques Chirac announced on 11 March that he would not seek a third term, before finally backing the candidacy of Sarkozy on 21 March.

Because the TNS Sofres poll conducted from 20 to 21 April was not published during the electoral silence, it is not included in the average below.

Official campaign

17 November 2006 to 19 March 2007

17 July to 16 November 2006

16 May to 16 July 2006

12 February 2005 to 15 May 2006

By region 
Nord-Pas-de-Calais

Provence-Alpes-Côte-d'Azur

Provence-Alpes-Côte-d'Azur and Languedoc-Roussillon

Corsica

Réunion

By department 
Alpes-de-Haute-Provence, Hautes-Alpes, and Vaucluse

Alpes-Maritimes, Bouches-du-Rhône, and Var

By commune 
Aix-en-Provence

Avignon

Marseille

Nice

Toulon

Second round 
During the 2007 presidential election, Ipsos launched the first ever rolling poll in France, described as a "continuous electoral barometer", publishing results every day of the week except Sunday for ten weeks starting on 1 March 2007. The Ifop poll conducted from 23 to 26 February 2007, marked with an asterisk (*) below, was conducted specifically for subsample data.

The publication of second-round polls was prohibited after midnight on 4 May 2007.

Graphical summary 
The averages in the graphs below were constructed using polls listed below conducted by the six major French pollsters. The graphs are 14-day weighted moving averages, using only the most recent poll conducted by any given pollster within that range (each poll weighted based on recency).

Royal–Sarkozy

By region 
Nord-Pas-de-Calais

Provence-Alpes-Côte-d'Azur

Provence-Alpes-Côte-d'Azur and Languedoc-Roussillon

Corsica

Réunion

By department 
Alpes-de-Haute-Provence, Hautes-Alpes, and Vaucluse

Alpes-Maritimes, Bouches-du-Rhône, and Var

Ariège, Aveyron, Haute-Garonne, Gers, Lot, Hautes-Pyrénées, Tarn, Tarn-et-Garonne, Aude, and Lot-et-Garonne
The BVA poll was conducted for La Dépêche du Midi in the 10 departments where the newspaper is circulated, of which eight are in the Midi-Pyrénées region (Ariège, Aveyron, Haute-Garonne, Gers, Lot, Hautes-Pyrénées, Tarn, and Tarn-et-Garonne), as well as Aude and Lot-et-Garonne.

By commune 
Aix-en-Provence

Avignon

Marseille

Nice

Toulon

Bayrou–Sarkozy

By region 
Nord-Pas-de-Calais

Réunion

Royal–Bayrou

By region 
Nord-Pas-de-Calais

Réunion

Sarkozy–Le Pen

By region 
Provence-Alpes-Côte-d'Azur

By department 
Alpes-de-Haute-Provence, Hautes-Alpes, and Vaucluse

Alpes-Maritimes, Bouches-du-Rhône, and Var

By commune

Royal–Le Pen

By region 
Provence-Alpes-Côte-d'Azur

By department 
Alpes-de-Haute-Provence, Hautes-Alpes, and Vaucluse

Alpes-Maritimes, Bouches-du-Rhône, and Var

By commune

Bayrou–Le Pen

Royal–Chirac

By region 
Provence-Alpes-Côte-d'Azur and Languedoc-Roussillon

Chirac–Le Pen

Strauss-Kahn–Sarkozy

Fabius–Sarkozy

Royal–Villepin

By region 
Réunion

Royal–Alliot-Marie

Jospin–Sarkozy

By region 
Réunion

Lang–Sarkozy

Hollande–Sarkozy

Jospin–Villepin

By region 
Réunion

Strauss-Kahn–Villepin

Fabius–Villepin

Hollande–Villepin

Emmanuelli–Sarkozy

Emmanuelli–Villepin

Fabius–Chirac

Jospin–Chirac

Hollande–Chirac

See also 
Opinion polling for the French legislative election, 2007
Opinion polling for the French presidential election, 2002
Opinion polling for the French presidential election, 2012
Opinion polling for the French presidential election, 2017

References

External links 
Notices of the French polling commission 

2007 French presidential election
Opinion polling in France
France